Vreny Burger (born 25 February 1955) is a former Swiss archer. She competed at the 1984 Summer Olympics and in the 1988 Summer Olympics.

References 

1955 births
Living people
Archers at the 1984 Summer Olympics
Archers at the 1988 Summer Olympics
Swiss female archers
Olympic archers of Switzerland
20th-century Swiss women